Captain Justus Scheibert (1831–1903) was a Prussian army officer, sent by Prussia to America to observe the American Civil War in order to learn the lessons to be learned and return to Prussia to teach these lessons to the Prussian troops. His writings became a source of Prussian, and later German, military strategy through five subsequent wars.

References

External links
 

1831 births
1903 deaths
German military writers
German male non-fiction writers